Mine Head Lighthouse is an excellently preserved operational 19th century lighthouse in Old Parish, County Waterford, Ireland.

George Halpin Senior designed the major light of Mine Head lighthouse. Constructed of red sandstone the structure stands on top of the steep cliffs above the Celtic Sea.

History
The lighthouse was built in 1851 and has a 22 m (72 ft.) white tower with a black band. It was converted to electricity in September 1964. The beacon flashes white and red every 2.5 sec. and has a range of 52 km (28 nautical miles). A new light with a decreased range of 22.224 km (12 nautical miles) was installed in 2012.

See also

 List of lighthouses in Ireland

References

External links

 Commissioners of Irish Lights: Mine Head

Lighthouses in the Republic of Ireland
Buildings and structures in County Waterford
Lighthouses on the National Inventory of Architectural Heritage